Na Katro Pankh Mere is a 2014 Pakistani television drama serial, directed by Nain Maniar. It is produced by Abdullah Seja under his production banner "Idream Entertainment" in collaboration with Nouman Masood production house, Naught Forty Productions. The serial stars Saba Qamar, Danish Taimoor and Hassan Niazi in lead roles.

Cast
Saba Qamar as Naamia
Danish Taimoor as Sameer
Hassan Niazi as Rehan
Uroosa Qureshi as Sonia aka Sonu- Sabeen's daughter
Saboor Aly as Anusha aka Annu- Sameer's sister
Asad Siddiqui as Jashan- Anusha's love interest but he's interested in Shazmeen
Shehzad Mukhtar as Maaz- Naamia, Shazmeen and Ramsha's father
Rida Isfahani as Shazmeen- Naamia's younger sister
Rabia Noreen as Sabeen- Sonia's mother and Sameer and Anusha's chachi
Seema Sehar as Nusrat- Rehan's mother
Ramsha as Ramsha- Naamia's younger sister
Nabeel Zuberi as Nabeel- Shazmeen's love interest
Parvez Raza as Aazar- Sonia's father and Sameer and Anusha's chacha
Hanif Muhammad as Jamshed- Jashan's father

References

External links 
 

Pakistani drama television series
2014 Pakistani television series debuts
2015 Pakistani television series endings
Urdu-language television shows
ARY Zindagi original programming